The Elsecar Heritage Railway (EHR) is located on the southern part of the former South Yorkshire Railway freight-only branch which ran from Elsecar Junction on its Mexborough to Barnsley Line.

The Elsecar Heritage Railway operated an out and back tourist train ride on a  section of the branch using steam and diesel locomotives, previously running between Rockingham station (at the back of the Elsecar Heritage Centre) and Hemingfield Basin. The railway was operated using a variety of different preserved rolling stock.

The EHR had planned to eventually operate the line into Cortonwood, with a new halt at Hemingfield, doubling the length of the line to two miles.

History
The line was built to serve Earl Fitzwilliam's collieries and ironworks, which he leased out to local ironmasters. It opened in 1850 as part of the South Yorkshire Railway, known as the Elsecar Branch. Following assorted mergers the line finally became part of the LNER upon formation of the Big Four.

The whole infrastructure was nationalised after the Second World War, with the mines becoming part of the National Coal Board in 1947 and the railway becoming part of British Railways in 1948.

The Elsecar branch closed in 1984 following closure of the final colliery on the line.

Restoration began in 1994 as a project of Barnsley Metropolitan Borough Council, and the line reopened as a heritage railway in 1996, operated by the Council. The Elsecar Heritage Railway became the operator in 2006.

Closure

Elsecar Heritage Railway was mothballed indefinitely after operators surrender their lease in November 2020, it is reported that a commitment was made by Barnsley Council to reopen the site.

Motive power

Steam locomotives 
The railway's collection of steam locomotives are used regularly for passenger services.

 Sentinel  No. 6807 Gervase. (Running number 10) (Operational, returned to steam in 2013).
 Sentinel  No. 9376 (unnamed). (Running number 7) (Scrapped).
 Sentinel  No. 9599 William. (Operational, returned to steam in 2017).
 Peckett OQ Class  No. 2150 Mardy Monster. (Undergoing overhaul).
 Avonside  No. 1917 Earl Fitzwilliam, formerly Pitsford. (Stored).
 Robert Stephenson and Hawthorns  No. 7386 Birkenhead. (Undergoing overhaul).
 Hunslet  No. 469 Hastings. (Undergoing overhaul).

Diesel locomotives 
The railway's diesel locomotives are used to operate both passenger and engineering trains.

 Hunslet Engine Co.  No. 6950 Louise. (Operational.)
 Yorkshire Engine Company  No. 2895 Earl of Strafford. (Operational.)
 Sentinel  Elizabeth. (Operational.)

Other motive power

 Wickham trolley track inspection vehicle. (In storage, awaiting restoration.)

Coaching stock 
Coaching stock is painted in British Railways 'lined maroon' livery.
 BR Mk 1 TSO No. 3958. (In service.)
 BR Mk 1 TSO No. 4903. (In service.)
 BR Mk 1 BSK No. 35305. (In service.)
 BR Mk 1 SK No. 25562. (In service.)

Stations 

 Rockingham - Terminus and headquarters, serving the Elsecar Heritage Centre.
 Hemingfield - current temporary terminus, with groundworks complete for proposed new intermediate station.
 Cortonwood - planned new terminus station on the railway's Cortonwood extension.

Cortonwood extension
The railway's extension, currently under construction, involves the reinstatement of two level crossings, Tingle Bridge Lane and Smithy Lane. The latter, being a quiet road, will be protected by manually-operated crossing gates of traditional design. Tingle Bridge Lane is a busier road, and the railway is installing a semi-automated crossing barrier system, with barriers manually lowered from a signal box, but automatically raised by track circuitry. On 16 May 2011 the permanent way materials for the level crossing arrived and a donation scheme was set up to raise the remainder of the money needed. Funds raised through this scheme have since been used to purchase barriers and traffic signals for the crossing ready for installation. In August 2012 trial holes were dug to locate services under the road surface ready for the crossing installation to take place.

On 21 June 2012 the ground was cleared and levelled for ballast and track alterations in anticipation of constructing the station at Hemingfield, currently the end of the line.

On 19 April 2013 the EHR installed the level crossing on Tingle Bridge Lane, financed by a Director's loan, and began extending the line into Cortonwood Colliery, as the next step of the Project.

By June 2014 the whole track had been laid up to Cortonwood, with minor levelling and ballasting remaining to become operational. The railway is now engaged in refinements to the permanent way, together with the necessary regulatory processes (with the local authority and the Office of Rail and Road) to see the extension opened for public services.

Cortonwood memorial
In November 2013 the EHR received a lottery grant of £50,000 to finance the provision of a Coal Mining Memorial Park at Cortonwood Colliery, a nationally important site, where the 1984/5 Miners Strike began. The project was completed in November 2014.

See also
 Earl Fitzwilliam's private railway

References

External links 

 Elsecar Railway Website

Heritage railways in Yorkshire
Tourist attractions in Barnsley
Tourist attractions in Doncaster
Rail transport in South Yorkshire